Dark Force or Dark Forces may refer to:

Star Wars
The dark side of the Force
Star Wars: Dark Forces, a 1995 video game and novelization
Star Wars Jedi Knight: Dark Forces II, the sequel to the 1995 video game and novelization
Dark Force, the Katana fleet, a fictional fleet in the Thrawn trilogy of Star Wars novels

Entertainment
 Darkforce (Marvel Comics), a fictional cosmic force
 Dark Force, a character in the Phantasy Star video game series
 Dark Force (card game), a trading card game based on The Dark Eye
 Dark Forces (book), a 1981 horror anthology
 Dark Forces, or Harlequin, a 1980 Australian supernatural thriller
 Dark Forces (2020 film), a Mexican film

See also 

 
 
 
 
 Dark energy
 Dark flow
 Dark triad, a group of three "dark" personality traits
 Force (disambiguation)
 Dark (disambiguation)
 Dark Light (disambiguation)